The following is a list of netball players who played in the ANZ Championship between 2008 and 
2016.

ANZ Championship award winners
There were four official ANZ Championship Awards.

ANZ Championship Most Valuable Player

Notes
  Romelda Aiken and Sonia Mkoloma shared the 2008 award.
  Leana de Bruin and Natalie Medhurst shared the 2011 award.
  Temepara George and Laura Langman shared the 2012 award.
  Kimberlee Green and Joanne Harten shared the 2014 award.
  In 2015 Romelda Aiken was the MVP player in the Australian Conference and Jhaniele Fowler was the MVP player in the New Zealand Conference. 
  In 2016 Madison Robinson was the MVP player in the Australian Conference and Jhaniele Fowler was the MVP player in the New Zealand Conference.

ANZ Championship Grand Final MVP

Notes
  In 2015 and 2016 this award was changed to Finals Series MVP which includes all matches in the Finals and not just the Grand Final.

ANZ Championship Best New Talent

Foxtel ANZ Championship All Star Teams

2011

2012

2013

2014

2015

2016

Golden Bib Award
In 2014 the ANZ Championship introduced the Golden Bib Award which recognised the top attacker, top midcourter and top defender from each round. The award was determined on statistics and players earned two points for a goal assist and a point for centre pass receive.

2014

Australian Netball Awards

Liz Ellis Diamond
In 2008 Netball Australia introduced the Liz Ellis Diamond award in honour of Liz Ellis. It was awarded to the best performing player in the ANZ Championship and with the Australia national netball team. This is a list of the players who won the award during the ANZ Championship era. It was not awarded in 2016.

Australian ANZ Championship Player of the Year

Between 2008 and 2016, Netball Australia also had a separate award for best Australian player in the ANZ Championship.

New Zealand Netball Awards

New Zealand ANZ Championship Player of the Year

ANZ Championship top scorers

ANZ Championship winning captains

Notes
  In 2009, Bianca Chatfield and Sharelle McMahon were co-captains. 
  In 2010, Natalie von Bertouch and Mo'onia Gerrard were co-captains. 
  In 2011, Lauren Nourse captained Firebirds to the minor premiership but was injured for the play-offs. Laura Geitz captained Firebirds in the grand final.

ANZ Championship players with three winners medals

Gallery

References

 
Lists of netball players
ANZ